Yazawin Yine Thu Myar is a 2017 Burmese drama film starring Pyay Ti Oo, Myint Myat, Patricia and Laila Khan. The film, produced by Sein Htay Film Production premiered in Myanmar on August 11, 2017.

Cast
 Pyay Ti Oo as U Myint Mo
 Myint Myat as Moe Sway
 Patricia as Yain Mya Thar
 Laila Khan as Cynthia

References

2017 films
2010s Burmese-language films
Burmese drama films
Films shot in Myanmar
2017 drama films